is a video game developed by Mpen and published by Sunsoft on the PlayStation console.

The video game Monkey Magic is based on the anime series of the same name, an adaptation of the 16th-century Chinese novel Journey to the West.

It is a sidescrolling action/platform game with a blend of RPG-like elements; unique features include the ability to switch between the foreground, middle, and background layers in some sections, and four magic spells - Fire, Ice, Shrink, and Blossom - which can be cast on either the player's character (to cancel out enemy spells, for instance) or on enemies as a projectile.

References

1999 video games
PlayStation (console) games
PlayStation (console)-only games
Sunsoft games
Video games about primates
Video games developed in Japan
Video games based on anime and manga
Works based on Journey to the West
Video games based on Chinese mythology